Mustafa Taher Kasubhai is a United States magistrate judge for the United States District Court for the District of Oregon. He previously served as a judge on the Lane County Circuit Court from 2007 to 2018.

Early life and career 

Kasubhai was born in Los Angeles, California in 1970, and grew up in the Los Angeles suburb Canoga Park. His parents are Indian immigrants, having moved to the United States from Mumbai in the 1960s.

Kasubhai graduated from the University of California, Berkeley in 1992, with a degree in business administration. He completed his Juris Doctor degree at the University of Oregon School of Law in 1996, where he served as an associate editor on the Oregon Law Review, a graduate teaching fellow for the University of Oregon, and President of the Student Bar Association. 
 
Kasubhai began his private legal career in a small civil plaintiff’s firm until he opened his own practice, the Law Offices of Mustafa T. Kasubhai. He worked primarily between Klamath Falls and Eugene, Oregon serving a wide geographic area including rural communities, representing workers and unions in workers compensation cases and plaintiffs in civil cases primarily involving torts and work-related injuries.
 
In 2003, then Governor of Oregon Ted Kulongoski nominated Kasubhai to serve on the Oregon Workers’ Compensation Board as one of its labor members in Salem, Oregon. He remained there until joining the state bench 2007.

Kasubhai has been an active member of a number of Oregon legal associations and diversity groups including the Oregon State Bar Board of Bar Examiners, the Dean’s Advisory Council for the University of Oregon School of Law, Lane County Bar Association, Oregon Asian Pacific American Bar Association (OAPABA), Oregon Gay and Lesbian Lawyers Association (OGALA), and the Oregon chapters of Hispanic Bar Association and South Asian Bar Association.

He received the Daniel K. Inouye Trailblazer Award from the National Asian Pacific American Bar Association (NAPABA) in 2018, and the Justice Lynn Nakamoto Trailblazer Award from OAPABA that same year. Kasubhai also co-founded the Oregon Mediation Diversity Project in 2020.

Judicial Service 

Governor Kulongoski appointed Kasubhai as a judge on the Lane County Circuit Court in 2007. He was re-elected to another six-year term in 2014. Kasubhai was selected to join the federal bench in September 2018 from a pool of more than 50 applicants.
 
Kasubhai is the first Muslim-American to serve on the federal bench in the United States and was the first South Asian-American and Muslim-American judge to be appointed to the Lane County Circuit Court. Kasubhai regularly presents at continuing legal education programs and legal events.

Personal life 
In his spare time, Kasubhai enjoys woodworking, renovating his home, and power tools.

External links

See also 
 List of first minority male lawyers and judges in Oregon

References 

Living people
Federal judiciary of the United States
University of Oregon School of Law alumni
Haas School of Business alumni
Eugene, Oregon
1970 births